

References 

Additional references
 
 

V

ca:Locució llatina#V
da:Latinske ord og vendinger#V
fr:Liste de locutions latines#V
id:Daftar frasa Latin#V
it:Locuzioni latine#V
nl:Lijst van Latijnse spreekwoorden en uitdrukkingen#V
pt:Lista de provérbios e sentenças em latim#V
ro:Listă de locuțiuni în limba latină#V
sl:Seznam latinskih izrekov#V
sv:Lista över latinska ordspråk och talesätt#V
tl:Tala ng mga pariralang Latin#V